Lilac Bush (catalogue number : F 579, JH 1692) is a May 1889 oil on canvas painting by Vincent van Gogh, produced during his stay in Saint-Rémy. It is now in the Hermitage Museum.

The artist began painting almost as soon as he had arrived at the psychiatric hospital of Saint-Paul de Mausole in Saint-Rémy. Among his first subjects were the irises and lilac bush in the hospital garden, mentioned in a letter written to his brother Theo and Theo's wife Johanna a few days after his arrival:

References 

Paintings in the collection of the Hermitage Museum
Paintings by Vincent van Gogh
1889 paintings
Oil on canvas paintings
Paintings of Saint-Rémy-de-Provence by Vincent van Gogh